Pablo Alejandro Aprahamian Bakerdjian (born September 13, 1985) is a Uruguayan judoka. He competed at the 2016 Summer Olympics in the men's 100 kg event, in which he was eliminated in the second round by Rafael Buzacarini.

His brother Mikael is also a judoka.

References

External links
 

1985 births
Living people
Uruguayan people of Armenian descent
Uruguayan male judoka
Olympic judoka of Uruguay
Judoka at the 2016 Summer Olympics
South American Games silver medalists for Uruguay
South American Games medalists in judo
Competitors at the 2018 South American Games
University of Montevideo alumni